Kakopoda is a genus of moths in the family Erebidae. The genus was erected by J. B. Smith in 1900.

Species
Kakopoda agarrha (Druce, 1890) Mexico
Kakopoda mesostigma (Hampson, 1926) Venezuela
Kakopoda progenies (Guenée, 1852) Florida, Antilles - Brazil
Kakopoda stygia (Hampson, 1926) Guatemala
Kakopoda violascens (Hampson, 1926) Guyana

References

External links
 Images and distribution map.

Omopterini
Glossata genera